Euspiralta is a genus of sea snails, marine gastropod mollusks in the family Columbellidae, the dove snails.

Species
Species within the genus Euspiralta include:
 Euspiralta santoensis K. Monsecour & Pelorce, 2013

References

 Monsecour K. & Pelorce J. (2013) A new genus and species of Columbellidae (Mollusca: Gastropoda) from Vanuatu and New Caledonia. Gloria Maris 52(6): 184–189.

Columbellidae
Gastropod genera